Mount Cautley is located on the border of Alberta and British Columbia on the Continental Divide, SE of Assiniboine Pass.
Richard W. Cautley was a surveyor from Ipswich, England.  As part of the Alberta/British Columbia Boundary Commission, his party was in charge of mapping precise boundaries in the usable mountain passes of the Canadian Rockies.

See also
List of peaks on the British Columbia–Alberta border

References

Notes

Two-thousanders of Alberta
Two-thousanders of British Columbia
Canadian Rockies